{{Infobox person
| name               = Indrasish Roy
| image              = 
| height             = 5'11| birth_date         = 
| birth_place        = Kolkata, West Bengal, India
| nationality        = Indian
| occupation         = Actor
| known for          = Gaaner Oparey Adwitiya Dhulokona
| years_active       = 2008–present
| spouse             = Souravi Tarafdar
| website            = 
}}

Indrasish Roy is an Indian film and television actor. He played the role of Tintin in serial Gaaner Opare. Later he played the lead role of Chandrakiran Chowdhury, the male protagonist of serial Adwitiya. He debuted in films with Kaushik Ganguly's Rang Milanti.

 Career 
Indrasish Roy started his career as an assistant director of the short film And There Wasn't Ever After in 2008. He made his acting debut in the television series Champion in 2009 on Akash Bangla, where he played an antagonist, Ronnie. In 2010, he had his major break in the Bengali serial Gaaner Opare, where he played the role of Tintin. After that, he played the male lead character, Chandrakiran Chowdhury aka "Chand", in Adwitiya in 2011 on Star Jalsa. He also did a small stint in mega serial Subarnalata in 2012 on Zee Bangla, where he played the character Sunirmal, who showed solidarity with Bokul, Subaranalata's daughter. After his stints in television he moved on to films like Rang Milanti, The Play (film), Hrid Majharey, Aamar Aami, and Chotushkone.

 Gaaner Oparey Gaaner Oparey, an Indian Bengali-language television serial was produced by Ideas Creations, the production house of Prosenjit Chatterjee. It aired on Star Jalsha from 28 June 2010 to 16 April 2011. It was a tribute to the Indian Nobel laureate Rabindranath Tagore on his 150th birth anniversary. The script was written by Indian director and actor Rituparno Ghosh. Debojyoti Mishra directed the music, and  Dipankar De, Sabyasachi Chakraborty, Mimi Chakraborty, Gaurav Chakraborty, Arjun Chakraborty, and Anindita Bose were involved with the project.

Indrasish portrayed the character of Tintin (Trinanjon Banerjee) in the serial, a camera man working for the Shohor TV channel.

 Adwitiya Adwitiya, a production by Ideas Creations (Prosenjit Chatterjee), revolved around a young girl who goes to a rural village to chase her dreams and takes up the cudgels of putting this village on the path of  progress.  Shot with the Sunderbans as a backdrop, it was scripted by Anuja Chattopadhyay and Kausik Bhattacharya and directed by Joydeep Mukherjee.

Indrasish played the male lead character Chandrakiran Chowdhury, popularly known as "Chand" in the serial, along with Sohini Sarkar and Gaurav Chakraborty. He rose to mass popularity and won the award for Best Couple (along with Sohini Sarkar) at Star Jalsa Paribar Awards 2012.

 Rang Milanti 
Indrasish made his silver screen debut with the film Rang Milanti, a romantic comedy directed by Kaushik Ganguly, that released in September 2011 to wide critical and commercial acclaim.

He played the character Tito in the film, a passionate film buff and aspiring director with ambitious dreams of winning a Palme d'Or and an Oscar in the near future, who is in love with an ad-agency employee, Kamalika (Ridhima Ghosh).
He shared the screen with acclaimed actors like Churni Ganguly, Saswata Chatterjee and others like Gaurav Chakraborty, Gourab Chatterjee, Ridhima Ghosh, and Tanaji Dasgupta.

 The Play 
Indrasish played the central character "Mainak" in the 2013 Bengali film The Play (film),  a non-political mystery murder thriller revolving around the premises of a theater group in Kolkata. The film was scripted and directed by Ranjay Ray Choudhury  and was presented by Magic Entertainments. The music was composed by Joy Sarkar.

His role, Mainak, is an introverted struggling actor who came to the city of Kolkata and joined a theatre group where his entire life took a whirl after an incidental night. He shared the screen with actors like Rajesh Sharma and Mumtaz Sorcar.

Hrid MajhareyHrid Majharey is a critically acclaimed 2014 Bengali film directed by debutant director Ranjan Ghosh. The film is a tribute to William Shakespeare on the occasion of his 450th birthday. The plot revolves around a love story that is loosely inspired by certain iconic works of Shakespeare.

Indrasish played the character of Shubhro in the film, a charming, lively young man from Kolkata who runs an NGO in the Andaman Islands and is passionate about electronic music. He shared screen space with actors Abir Chatterjee and Raima Sen in the film.

Aamar AamiAamar Aami is a 2014 Bengali film directed by debutant director Orko Sinha.
This film deals with multiple wishes, desires and dreams of people living in the fast-paced city. The film featured actors Rahul Banerjee, Biswanath Basu, and Arunima Ghosh along with Indrasish Roy and others.

Indrasish played the character Soumya in the film, an aspiring young photographer with an engineering background who struggles to get a job in the media industry. Indrasish also appeared in the film Reunion by Murari M Rakshit.

 Dhulokona 

Dhulokona is an Indian Bengali serial written by Leena Gangopadhyay and was produced by the banner Magic Moments Motion Pictures on Star Jalsha . The show came on-air on 19 July 2021 and went off-air on 11 December 2022 after telecasting 505 episodes. This show revolved around a maid and a driver, who also is a rap singer, work in a upper middle class family and their relationship despite both of them having ample of ups and downs in their lives and trying to keep people happy and by proving that even being unsuccessful in life, a person can prove himself/herself successful.  

Indrasish played the character of Lalon, the driver of the upper middle class family as well as a rap singer. He played the lead role opposite to Manali Dey. The on-screen chemistry of Manali Dey and Indrasish Roy is still favourite to audiences.  

 Other ventures 
Apart from acting Indrasish is an active participant in the Celebrity Cricket League, where he plays for the Bengal Tigers and has performed consistently in the 2012, 2013, 2014 and 2015 series as an all rounder player. Indrasish has been passionate about cricket since childhood and has been quoted as saying, "Getting into the shooting floor was by mistake. He was meant to be a Cricketer."

 Filmography 
List of films of Indrasish Roy:

 Unreleased films 

 Television works 

 Web series 
List of web series works of Indrasish Roy:

 Awards 
 Best Couple Award:- Star Jalsha Paribar Awards 2012 (Alongside Sohini Sarkar) for megaserial Adwitiya''

References

External links 
 
 Twitter Account of Indrasish Roy
 Indrasish Roy Great Singer in Real Life

Living people
21st-century Indian male actors
Indian male film actors
Indian male television actors
Bengali Hindus
Bengali male actors
Male actors from Kolkata
Male actors in Bengali cinema
1986 births
Bengali male television actors

id:Indrasish Roy
sr:Индрасисх Рои